Zhang Shibo (born February 1952) is a retired general of the Chinese People's Liberation Army of China. He served as commander of the PLA Hong Kong Garrison, commander of the Beijing Military Region, and president of the PLA National Defence University.

Biography
Zhang Shibo was born in February 1952 in Zhuji, Zhejiang Province. He joined the PLA in 1970, serving as an ordinary soldier in the Jinan Military Region. He later rose to deputy commander of the 54th Group Army, deputy chief of staff of the Jinan MR, and commander of the 20th Group Army. He graduated from Shandong University with a degree in Marxist philosophy.

In 2008, he replaced Lieutenant General Wang Jitang as commander of the PLA Hong Kong Garrison. He attained the rank of lieutenant general (zhong jiang) in July 2009.

In October 2012, Zhang Shibo was promoted to commander of the Beijing Military Region. In December 2014, Lieutenant General Song Puxuan replaced him as commander of the Beijing MR, and Zhang took over Song's old position as president of the PLA National Defence University. On 31 July 2015, Zhang Shibo was promoted to general (shang jiang), the highest rank for Chinese military officers in active service.

Zhang was an alternate member of the 17th Central Committee of the Communist Party of China (2007–12), and a full member of the 18th Central Committee (2012–17).

References

1952 births
Living people
People's Liberation Army generals from Zhejiang
People from Zhuji
Shandong University alumni
Commanders of the People's Liberation Army Hong Kong garrison
Deputy Chiefs of Staff of the Jinan Military Region
Delegates to the 11th National People's Congress
Commanders of the Beijing Military Region
Presidents of the PLA National Defence University
Alternate members of the 17th Central Committee of the Chinese Communist Party
Members of the 18th Central Committee of the Chinese Communist Party